European route E41 is a European route. Its route is Dortmund - Hagen - Olpe - Siegen - Wetzlar - Hanau - Aschaffenburg - Würzburg - Heilbronn - Stuttgart - Böblingen - Herrenberg - Villingen-Schwenningen - Bad Dürrheim - Singen - Schaffhausen - Winterthur - Zürich - Schwyz - Altdorf.

Route 
 
  Dortmund - Witten - Hagen - Lüdenscheid - Olpe - Siegen - Herborn - Wetzlar - Gießen - Hanau
  Hanau
  Hanau - Kleinostheim
  Kleinostheim - Aschaffenburg - Wertheim - Würzburg
  Würzburg -  Heilbronn - Bietigheim-Bissingen - Ludwigsburg - Leonberg - Stuttgart
  Stuttgart
  Stuttgart - Sindelfingen - Herrenberg - Rottenburg am Neckar - Villingen-Schwenningen - Singen (Hohetwiel)
  Singen (Hohetwiel) - / border crossing

References

External links 
 UN Economic Commission for Europe: Overall Map of E-road Network (2007)

41
041
E041